Eduard Päll (pseudonym Hugo Angervaks; 15 October 1903, Koosa, Kreis Dorpat, Governorate of Livonia – 13 June 1989 Tallinn) was an Estonian politician, linguist and writer.

1947–1950, he was the chairmen of the Presidium of the Supreme Soviet of the Estonian Soviet Socialist Republic.

References

External links
 Eduard Päll at Estonian Writers' Online Dictionary

1903 births
1989 deaths
People from Peipsiääre Parish
People from Kreis Dorpat
Members of the Central Committee of the Communist Party of Estonia
Heads of state of the Estonian Soviet Socialist Republic
Members of the Supreme Soviet of the Estonian Soviet Socialist Republic, 1947–1951
Second convocation members of the Supreme Soviet of the Soviet Union
Third convocation members of the Supreme Soviet of the Soviet Union
Linguists from Estonia
Estonian male writers
Academic staff of Tallinn University
Recipients of the Order of Lenin
Recipients of the Order of the Red Banner of Labour
Recipients of the Order of the Red Star
Burials at Metsakalmistu